is a Japanese manga series written and illustrated by Kazunori Tahara. It was serialized in Shogakukan's seinen manga magazine Weekly Big Comic Spirits from January 2018 to February 2019, with its chapters collected in four tankōbon volumes.

Publication
Shogakukan collected its chapters in four tankōbon volumes, released from April 28, 2010, to August 30, 2013.

Volume list

See also
Mill—Another manga series by the same author.

References

External links
 

Athletics mass media
Romance anime and manga
School life in anime and manga
Shogakukan manga
Seinen manga
Sports anime and manga